The following is a list of notable deaths in August 2005.

Entries for each day are listed alphabetically by surname. A typical entry lists information in the following sequence:
 Name, age, country of citizenship at birth, subsequent country of citizenship (if applicable), reason for notability, cause of death (if known), and reference.

August 2005

1
John Alevizos, 85, American businessman.
Al Aronowitz, 77, American music journalist, cancer.
Wim Boost, 87, Dutch cartoonist.
Donald Brooks, 77, American Hollywood and Broadway costume designer.
Constant, 85, Dutch COBRA painter.
King Fahd bin Abdul Aziz al-Saud of Saudi Arabia, 84, Saudi Arabian King, complications of a stroke suffered in 1995.
William Hugh Clifford Frend, 89, English ecclesiastical historian.
Dame Betty Ridley, 95, British church administrator, Third Church Estates Commissioner.
David Shaw, 62, American journalist, Los Angeles Times writer and Pulitzer Prize winner, brain tumor.
Robert Stone, 49, Australian rugby league player.

2
Erasmus Darwin Barlow, 90, British psychiatrist.
Sandro Bolchi, 81, Italian director and journalist.
Alfredo Corvino, 89, Uruguayan ballet dancer and ballet teacher.
Jay Hammond, 83, American politician, Governor of Alaska from 1975 to 1982.
Tuukka Mäkelä, 77, Finnish Olympic shooter.
Hassan Moghaddas, 42, Iranian judge in the case of Akbar Ganji and high-profile cases; assassinated by unknown motorbike assailant.
Loulie Jean Norman, 92, American soprano.
Steven Vincent, 49, American freelance reporter, shot dead in Basra, Iraq.

3
Zainab al Ghazali, 88, Egyptian activist.
Luis Barbero, 88, Spanish actor.
Paddie Bell, 74, Irish folk singer.
Françoise d'Eaubonne, 85, French writer.
Dick Heyward, 90, Australian longtime deputy director of UNICEF.
Ernest Alvia ("Smokey") Smith, 91, Canadian Victoria Cross recipient.
Susan Torres, 26, American brain-dead woman kept alive to give birth.

4
Charles Alden Black, 86, American businessman, husband of Shirley Temple, myelodysplastic syndrome.
"Little" Milton Campbell, 71, American blues musician.
Peter Cundy, 88, British World War II pilot.
Ileen Getz, 43, American actress (3rd Rock From The Sun, Changing Lanes, The Station Agent), cancer.
Sue Gunter, 66, American women's basketball coach.
Anatoly Larkin, 72, Russian theoretical physicist.
David MacKenzie, 83, Scottish rugby union player.
Firmin Martin Schmidt, 86, American Roman Catholic prelate, Bishop of Mendi.

5
Polina Astakhova, 68, Soviet five time Olympic gymnastic champion.
Fritze Carstensen, 80, Danish Olympic swimmer.
Ian Fyfe, 58, Pakistani sports journalist.
Bertie Hill, 78, British equestrian.
Raymond Klibansky, 99, German-Canadian academic and philosopher.
Maria Korp, 50, Australian 'body in the boot' crime victim.
Raul Roco, 63, Filipino politician, former senator and presidential candidate, cancer.
Jane Lawrence Smith, 90, American actress also associated with 1950s art scene.
Cal Hogue, 77, American baseball player.

6
Nikolay Abramov, 55, Russian footballer.
Leonardo Rodríguez Alcaine, 86, Mexican trade union leader.
Vizma Belsevica, 74, Latvian poet.
Keter Betts, 77, American jazz bassist.
Robin Cook, 59, British Member of Parliament, former Foreign Secretary.
Ibrahim Ferrer, 78, Afro-Cuban musician, singer in the Buena Vista Social Club.
Louis Gauthier, 89, French cyclist.
Carlo Little, 66, British drummer, lung cancer.
John Tomlinson, 73, British educationalist.
James Wilson, 82, Irish composer.

7
Leni Alexander, 81, German-born Chilean composer.
Alejandro Armendáriz, 82, Argentinian physician and politician.
Paul Arnaud de Foïard, 83, French Army general.
Fannie Barrios, 41, Venezuelan bodybuilder.
Peter Jennings, 67, Canadian-born American correspondent, news anchor of ABC News, complications from lung cancer.
Mikhail Yevdokimov, 47, Russian comedian and politician, car accident.

8
Robert A. Baker, 84, American psychologist.
Barbara Bel Geddes, 82, American actress (Cat on a Hot Tin Roof, Dallas, Vertigo), lung cancer.
Ahmed Deedat, 80, South African Muslim preacher.
John H. Johnson, 87, American publisher.
Gene Mauch, 79, American Major League Baseball manager.
Matthew McGrory, 32, American actor (Big Fish, The Devil's Rejects, House of 1000 Corpses), heart failure.
Nicolae Dumitru, 76, Romanian football player and manager.
Ilse Werner, 84, German actress.

9
Colette Besson, 59, French athlete and Olympic 400m champion runner.
Dorris Bowdon, 90, American actress.
Al Carmines, 69, American musician.
Marco Cavagna, 46/47, Italian astronomer.
François Dalle, 87, French entrepreneur, CEO of L'Oréal cosmetics.
Stanley DeSantis, 52, American actor (Tales of the City), designer, heart attack.
Abraham Hirschfeld, 85, Polish-born New York City developer, of cancer.
Rita Keller, 72, American baseball player (AAGPBL).
Philip J. Klass, 85, American aviation journalist, UFO debunker, cancer.
Judith Rossner, 70, American author (Looking for Mr. Goodbar), diabetes and cancer.
Nikolay Serebryakov, 76, Russian film director.
Kay Tremblay, 91, Canadian actress (Road to Avonlea).

10
Mar Amongo, 68, Filipino comic book artist.
Jaroslav Koutecký, 83, Czech physical chemist
Roy Marlin "Butch" Voris, 85, American retired US Navy Captain, World War II flying ace, founder and two-time commander of the United States Navy Blue Angels.

11
Justus A. Akinsanya, 68, Nigerian-born British nurse.
Ernesta Ballard, 85, American feminist and former head of the Pennsylvania Horticultural Society.
James Booth, 77, British actor (Zulu).
Manfred Korfmann, 63, German archaeologist.
Ted "Double Duty" Radcliffe, 103, American Negro leagues baseball player.

12
Francy Boland, 75, Belgian jazz pianist, arranger: top European swing band 1960s and 1970s.
Robert Bonner, 84, Canadian politician and businessman.
Greg Calvert, 68, American political activist.
Teruo Ishii, 81, Japanese movie maker.
Lakshman Kadirgamar, 73, Sri Lankan foreign minister, assassination.
Joe Korp, 47, Australian "body in the boot" suspect, suicide.
Charlie Norman, 84, Swedish jazz pianist and film music writer.
Julian Stanley, 87, American psychologist, "Champion of Gifted Students".

13
Wladimiro Calarese, 74, Italian Olympic fencer.
George Carpenter, 96, Irish Olympic fencer.
Arnold Cooke, 98, British composer.
W.J. Bryan Dorn, 89, American politician, former Democratic United States Representative from South Carolina 1947–1949, and 1951–1974.
David Lange, 63, New Zealand politician, former Labour Prime Minister of New Zealand, main proponent of anti-nuclear policy.
Robbie Millar, 38, Northern Irish chef and restaurateur.
Donald Howard Shively, 84, American professor, among the first to promote modern East Asian Studies, Shy–Drager syndrome.
Miguel Arraes, 88, Brazilian politician, former Governor of Pernambuco

14
Stephen C. Apostolof, 78, Bulgarian-born American filmmaker.
William Henry Beierwaltes, 88, American physician.
Coo Coo Marlin, 73, American NASCAR driver.
Billy More, 40, Italian drag queen music artist.
Beverly Wolff, 76, American mezzo-soprano.
Esther Wong, 88, Chinese-born American music promoter.

15
Gordon James Oakes, 74, British politician, former Labour government minister and member of the Privy Council of the United Kingdom, cancer.
James Dougherty (police officer), 84, American police officer, first trainer of the Special Weapons and Tactics and first husband of actress Marilyn Monroe.
Peter Smit, 43, Dutch martial artist, former European and world champion kickboxer, shot to death in Rotterdam.
Herta Ware, 88, American actress (Cocoon, Cruel Intentions, Species).

16
Vassar Clements, 77, American fiddle player and bluegrass musician.
Tonino Delli Colli, 81, Italian cinematographer (The Good, the Bad and the Ugly, Once Upon a Time in the West, Once Upon a Time in America).
Aleksandr Gomelsky, 77, Soviet Hall of Fame basketball coach, cancer.
Derek Page, Baron Whaddon, 77, British politician.
Joe Ranft, 45, American animator, screenwriter and voice actor (Toy Story, A Bug's Life, Finding Nemo), car accident.
Eva Renzi, 60, German actress, cancer.
Frère Roger, 90, Swiss Christian leader and monk, founder of the Taizé Community, murdered by an assailant.

17
Richard Altham, 81, English cricketer.
John N. Bahcall, 70, American astrophysicist.
Dalibor Brazda, 83, Czech-born Swiss composer, arranger and conductor.
Lars Kristian Brynildsen, 50, Norwegian clarinetist.
Dottie Hunter, 89, American baseball player (All-American Girls Professional Baseball League).
Lloyd Meeds, 77, American politician, former Democratic United States Representative from Washington from 1965–1979.
Bertram L. Podell, 79, American politician, former Democratic United States Representative from New York 1967–1975.
Ron Smillie, 71, English footballer.
Howard Watt, 94, South African rugby union player.

18
Christopher Bauman, Jr., 23, American professional wrestler
Andrónico Luksic, 78, Croatian-descent Chilean millionaire businessman, richest man of his country.
Meredith Merle Nicholson, 92, American cinematographer.
Gao Xiumin, 46, Chinese comedy actress, heart attack.

19
Mansour Armaly, 78, Palestinian ophthalmologist and early glaucoma researcher, cancer.
Aušra Augustinavičiūtė, 78, Lithuanian psychologist.
Faimalaga Luka, 65, Tuvaluan politician, former prime minister and governor-general of Tuvalu.
Dennis Lynds, 81, American mystery novelist under the pseudonym Michael Collins.
O. Madhavan, 83, Indian actor and director.
Abraham Bueno de Mesquita, 87, Dutch comedian, cancer.
Mo Mowlam, 55, British politician, complications after a fall.
Randy Turner, 55, American musician with the hardcore punk band Big Boys.
Mel Welles, 83, American actor, writer, director.

20
Abraham Goldstein, 80, American law professor, former dean of Yale Law School, heart attack.
Thomas Herrion, 23, American NFL player with the San Francisco 49ers, ischemic heart disease.
Steven Ronald Jensen, 46, American musician and founding member of The Vandals.
Miljenko Kovačić, 32, Croatian soccer player, motorcycle accident.
Julius Curtis Lewis Jr., 79, American businessman and philanthropist.
Krzysztof Raczkowski, 35, Polish drummer (Vader).
Clifford Williams, 78, British theatre director.

21
Liv Aasen, 76, Norwegian politician.
Mary Bowerman, 97, American botanist.
Liam Burke, 77, Irish politician.
Martin Dillon, 48, American musician, operatic tenor and professor of music, heart attack.
David Ironside, 80, South African cricketer.
James Jerome, 72, Canadian jurist and politician, former Speaker of the Canadian House of Commons.
Colin McEwan, 64, Australian comedian and actor, cancer.
Robert Moog, 71, American electronic music inventor and pioneer, brain tumor.
Dahlia Ravikovitch, 69, Israeli poet and author.

22
Luc Ferrari, 76, French musique concrète composer.
Richard Kelly, 81, American politician, former Republican United States Representative from Florida from 1975–1981.
Elizabeth Knight, 60, British actress (Oliver!, McCabe & Mrs. Miller, It's Awfully Bad for Your Eyes, Darling), heart disease.
Geoffrey Lane, Baron Lane, 87, British judge and former Lord Chief Justice.
Juliet Pannett, 94, English portrait painter.
Mati Unt, 61, Estonian writer and theatre director.
Morris Ziff, 91, American rheumatic disease expert, cardiac arrest.

23
Eddie Burks, 82, British civil engineer and psychic.
Glenn Corneille, 35, Dutch musician and pianist, car crash.
William J. Eaton, 74, American Pulitzer Prize–winning journalist and author.
Sir Jack Hibbert, 73, British statistician, Head of the Central Statistical Office, UK.
Milt Jackson, 61, American football coach, heart attack.
Brock Peters, 78, American actor (To Kill a Mockingbird, Porgy and Bess, Star Trek: Deep Space Nine), pancreatic cancer.
Lyndon Woodside, 70, American choral conductor.

24
Jamshed Ansari, 62, Pakistani actor.
Maurice Cowling, 78, British historian.
Ambrogio Fogar, 64, Italian adventurer, heart attack.
Kaleth Morales, 21, Colombian "New Wave" vallenato singer and songwriter.
Tom Pashby, 90, Canadian ophthalmologist and sport safety advocate.
Yuri Sarantsev, 76, Soviet/Russian actor.
Jack Slipper, 81, English Scotland Yard detective.
Herbert Wright, 57, American television producer.

25
Ruth Aaronson Bari, 87, American mathematician.
Walter Becher, 92, German politician.
Philippe Bradshaw, 39, British artist.
Sir Frederick Corfield, 90, British politician.
Peter Glotz, 66, German politician.
Georgi Iliev, 39, Bulgarian businessman and president of Lokomotiv Plovdiv, murdered by sniper in Sunny Beach.
Perry Lafferty, 89, American television producer, cancer.
Terence Morgan, 83, British actor.
Eleanor Warren, 86, British cellist and music producer.
Reyhan Angelova, 19, Bulgarian singer, car accident.

26
Wolfgang Bauer, 64, Austrian playwright.
Denis "Piggy" D'Amour, 45, Canadian musician, guitarist of Canadian metal band Voivod, cancer.
Robert Denning, 78, American interior designer, silver-haired fixture of society in Paris and New York.
Gerry Fitt, Baron Fitt, 79, Northern Irish politician from West Belfast, elevated to the House of Lords.
Ed "Sailor" White, 56, Canadian professional wrestler best known as "Moondog King".

27
Aldo Aniasi, 84, Italian politician.
John Bean, 92, British Army officer and  cricket player.
Romulo Espaldon, 79, Filipino military officer and diplomat.
Jan Moor-Jankowski, 81, Polish-American primatologist, stroke.
Seán Purcell, 76, Irish Gaelic footballer.
Andrés Vázquez de Prada, 80, Spanish historian, lawyer, diplomat and writer.

28
Ali Said Abdella, 55, Eritrean politician, foreign minister of Eritrea, heart attack.
Hans Clarin, 75, German actor.
Jacques Dufilho, 91, French comedian.
Esther Szekeres, (née Klein), 95, Hungarian mathematician.
George Szekeres, 94, Hungarian mathematician.
Reza Zavare'i, 67, Iranian lawyer and politician.

29
Ishaya Audu, 79, Nigerian politician.
Nikolai Sergeevich Bakhvalov, 71, Russian mathematician.
Balfour Brickner, 78, American rabbi.
Sir Hugh Collum, 65, British businessman.
Sybil Marshall, 91, British writer and broadcaster.
Margaret Scott, 71, Australian author and poet.
Jude Wanniski, 69, American journalist and supply-side economist.

30
Charles L. Allen, 92, American Methodist minister.
Hendrikje van Andel-Schipper, 115, Dutch supercentenarian, oldest recognized person in the world, gastric cancer.
John Brown, 90, Scottish footballer.
Cecily Brownstone, 96, Canadian long-time Associated Press cuisine writer, pneumonia.
Michael Frary, 87, American painter.
James H. Scheuer, 85, American politician, former liberal Democrat United States Representative from New York 1965–1973 and 1975–1993.

31
Patrick Tobin Asselin, 75, Canadian politician.
Eladia Blázquez, 74, Argentine tango player and composer.
Stéphane Bruey, 72, French football player.
John Donaldson, Baron Donaldson of Lymington, 84, British judge and peer, former Master of the Rolls.
Jaan Kiivit, Jr, 65, Estonian former Lutheran archbishop.
Soo Bee Lee, 71, Singaporean soprano.
Sir Joseph Rotblat, 96, Polish-born British physicist, Nobel laureate, anti-nuclear weapons campaigner, founder of Pugwash Conferences.
Theodore R. Sarbin, 94, American psychologist.
Michael Sheard, 67, Scottish actor (The Empire Strikes Back), cancer.
Nina Ulyanenko, 81, Russian aviator.
Julius Westheimer, 88, American financial analyst.

References

2005-08
 08